Tales of the Texas Rangers is a 20th century Western old-time radio and television police procedural drama which originally aired on NBC Radio from 1950 to 1952 and later on CBS Television from 1955 to 1958. Film star Joel McCrea voiced the radio version as the fictitious Texas Ranger Jace Pearson, who uses the latest scientific techniques to identify criminals. His faithful horse, Charcoal (or "Charky"), helps Pearson to track down the culprits. The radio shows, some of which are available on the Internet, are reenactments of actual Texas Ranger cases.

The television version was produced and also directed for several episodes by Stacy Keach, Sr. It was sponsored for part of its run by Wheaties cereal. Captain Manuel T. "Lone Wolf" Gonzaullas, who was said to have killed thirty-one men during his 30-year career as a Texas Ranger, was the consultant for the television series, as he had been for the earlier radio series.  The television version was filmed by Screen Gems.

On radio, Joel McCrea's Pearson often worked by request with a local sheriff's office or police department. But in the television version, Willard Parker assumed the role of Jace Pearson and had a regular partner, Ranger Clay Morgan, who had been an occasional character on the radio show. Morgan was portrayed in the television version by Harry Lauter. William Boyett appeared five times on the television series, including the role of Wade Crowell in the 1955 premiere episode, "Ransom Flight."

During the opening and closing credits of the television series, the actors march toward the camera as an off-screen men's chorus sings the theme song, "These Are Tales of Texas Rangers", to the tune of "The Eyes of Texas Are Upon You" and "I've Been Working on the Railroad". The radio series used contemporary cases and modern detective methods to solve crimes; it was a procedural drama, in many ways Jack Webb's Dragnet with a western flavor. 

The television version had some episodes set in the 1950s, comparable in some ways to Rod Cameron's syndicated series, State Trooper. Other episodes were set in the 19th century in a traditional western genre. In each case, Parker and Lauter were involved with chases and shoot-outs. The weaponry varied greatly between the modern and older stories.

Irving J. Moore, later with Gunsmoke, began his career as a director on two episodes of Tales of the Texas Rangers. Besides Keach and Moore, the other directors included Lew Landers, George Blair, and Earl Bellamy.

Guest stars (TV series)

Chris Alcaide, as Clint Hollister in "Uranium Pete", as Slade in "Hail to the Rangers" (both 1955), and as Ben Thomas in "Trail Herd" (1957) 
Stanley Andrews, four episodes, mainly as Marshal MacDonald
Morris Ankrum, as Colonel Cole Bryson in "Trail Herd" (1957)
Gregg Barton, as George Webster in "Horseman of the Sierras" (1956) and as Quiqley in "Double Reward" (1957)
Ray Boyle, in "Streamlined Rustlers" (1957) 
Lane Bradford, as Asa Brockway in "Blazing Across the Pecos" and as Big Jack in "The Rough Tough West" (both 1955)
X Brands, as Johnnie Tyce in "Whirlwind Raiders" (1957) 
Paul Brinegar, as the lead guest star in "The Hobo" (1956)
Harry Cheshire, as Joe Chaney in "Desert Fury" (1958) 
Andy Clyde in "Hardrock's Dilemma" and "Double Reward" (both 1957)
Michael Dante, as Alfred in "Edge of Danger" (1958)
Anthony Eisley, as Jack Carr in "Kickback" (1958)
Dick Elliott, as prospector Pete Cooper in "Uranium Pete" (1955) and as Sheriff Tiny Morris in "Both Barrels Blazine" (1957)
Frank Ferguson, as Dembrow in "Deadfall" (1958)
Leo Gordon, as Joe Brock in "Desert Fury" (1958)
Ron Hagerthy, as Jim Hartley in "The Devil's Deputy" (1956) 
Don C. Harvey, as Milo Paxin in "Return of the Rough Riders" (1955)
Harry Harvey, Jr., as Jeff Thorpe in "Traitor's Gold" (1958)
Ed Hinton, as Matt Carter in "Blazing Across the Pecos" and as Walker in "The Rough, Tough West" (both 1955)
I. Stanford Jolley, as Sheriff Clinton in "West of Sonora"; the sheriff fights a former outlaw for custody of a little girl.
Jimmy Lydon, as Lt. Jared Evans in "Warpath" (1958)
Ewing Mitchell, as Tom Weldon in "Whirlwind Raiders" (1957)
Dennis Moore, as Jim Webb in "Panhandle" (1956)
Burt Mustin, as Ned Watkins in "Home in San Antone" (1955)
Gregg Palmer, as Pete Hackett in "Panhandle" (1956) 
Eddie Parker, three times and as stuntman
John M. Pickard, as Frank Warren in "Ransom Flight", the series premiere
Paul Picerni, as Philip Conzog in "Gypsy Boy" (1957)
Denver Pyle, as Noah Reed in "Texas Flyer" (1958)
Rhodes Reason, as Sheriff Tom Keever in "Uranium Pete" and as Dave in "Hail to the Rangers" (both 1955)
Olan Soule, as Bill Peters in "Steel Trap" (1958)
Marjorie Stapp, as Stacey Walker in "Ambush" (1958, series finale)
Dub Taylor, as Jack Geyer in "The Fifth Plague" (1958) 
Pierre Watkin, as Ross Oliver in "Jace and Clay" (1958)
Grant Withers, as Ramrod Johnson in "Cattle Drive" (1958)

Radio episode log

Comic book adaptations

The series was adapted into a comic book distributed by Dell Comics and drawn by Dan Spiegle. It also inspired Willy Vandersteen's Suske en Wiske album De Texasrakkers.

References

External links 

 Tales of the Texas Rangers (1955–59) at Internet Movie Database

Fictional characters of the Texas Ranger Division
Western (genre) radio series
1950 radio programme debuts
1952 radio programme endings
1950s Western (genre) television series
CBS original programming
American radio dramas
1955 American television series debuts
1957 American television series endings
1950s American radio programs
Television series by Sony Pictures Television
Black-and-white American television shows
Television series about the Texas Ranger Division
Television shows set in Texas
NBC radio programs
Radio programs adapted into television shows
Radio programs adapted into comics
Television shows adapted into comics
Television series by Screen Gems